The My New Orleans Tour was a 2007 concert tour by American singer, pianist, and actor Harry Connick Jr. backed by his big band. The tour promoted his albums Oh, My NOLA (My New Orleans) and Chanson du Vieux Carré. The first concert of the tour was on February 23, 2007 at the Mizner Park Amphitheatre in Boca Raton, Florida. The first part of the tour took place in the USA and Canada. The second part of the tour was in Europe, and in 2008 the tour came to Asia and Australia.

One of the dates was the closing act at the New Orleans Jazz & Heritage Festival, on May 6, 2007. Connick was also supposed to be part of a concert with clarinetist Alvin Batiste at the same festival, called "Marsalis Music honors Alvin Batiste & Bob French". However, Batiste died of an apparent heart attack only hours before he was to perform. The concert, that also included Branford Marsalis and Bob French, went on as planned, in memory of Alvin Batiste.

At the Montreal Jazz Festival, on June 30, 2007, Connick received the Ella Fitzgerald Award, "in recognition of the versatility, improvisational originality and quality of repertoire of a jazz singer renowned on the international scene."

For the March 9, 2008 concert in Shanghai, China, an old set list had mistakenly been given to Chinese authorities when applying for permits to play in China. An hour before the concert, authorities showed up, and the old set list was found to contain songs that were considered inappropriate to perform, and a number of "safe" songs were added. Connick & co. revised the set list with current songs, but did not get approval. Connick's big band did not have the charts for the permitted songs on the old set list, so they often remained quiet through the concert. Connick issued a statement four days later, saying "Due to circumstances beyond my control, I was not able to give my fans in China the show I intended." The issue that China had with Connick's setlist, was likely to stem from a March 2 concert with Björk, who dedicated a song to Tibet at the end of her performance. (See Björk: "Declare Independence" live dedications)

Personnel

Band 
 
vocals, piano: Harry Connick Jr.
Trombone: Lucien Barbarin, Joe Barati, Jeff Bush, Dion Tucker
Trumpet: Roger Ingram, Derrick Gardner, Mark Braud, Leroy Jones, Bijon Watson 
Bass: Neal Caine
Alto saxophone: Charles "Ned" Goold 
Baritone saxophone: David Schumacher
Tenor saxophone: Jerry Weldon
drums: Arthur Latin

Band member Dion Tucker proposed to his girlfriend, on stage during the concert on April 21, 2007, in Radio City Music Hall, in New York City.

Setlist (incomplete)
There are variations from concert to concert, and also a number of songs not named here, have been performed.

Songs performed most regularly, or quite often
instrumental medley of classic tunes and Connick originals 
"Come By Me"  (from his 1999 album Come By Me)
"Let Them Talk" (from his 2007 album Oh, My NOLA) 
"Working In The Coal Mine" (from Oh, My NOLA)
"Jambalaya (On The Bayou)" (from Oh, My NOLA)
"Hello Dolly" (from Oh, My NOLA)
"Won't You Come Home, Bill Bailey?" (from Oh, My NOLA) 
"All These People" (from Oh, My NOLA) 
"Yes We Can" (from Oh, My NOLA)
"Basin Street Blues"  (from his 1988 album 20)
"Didn't He Ramble" (from his 1992 album 25)

Other performed songs (1 or several times)
"Dan Dan the Driving Man" (new, unrecorded, about Dan who drives the tour bus)
"On the Sunny Side of the Street"  (from his 1987 album Harry Connick Jr.)
"Sweet Georgia Brown"  (from his 1979 album Eleven)
"New Orleans"  (from his 2007 album Chanson du Vieux Carré)
"Sugar Blues"  (unrecorded)
"Do Dat Thing"  (from his 2007 album Oh, My NOLA)
"St. James Infirmary Blues"  (bonus track on his 1999 album Come By Me)
"Mardi Gras in New Orleans"  (from his 2007 album Chanson du Vieux Carré)
"It Had to Be You"  (from his 1989 album When Harry Met Sally...)

Tour dates

References

External links
CBS 5's Liam Mayclem interview with Harry Connick Jr. on tour, May 24, 2007

2007 concert tours
Harry Connick Jr.